Brăteşti may refer to several places in Romania:

 Brăteşti, a village in Albeştii de Argeş Commune, Argeș County
 Brăteşti, a village in Bârsănești Commune, Bacău County
 Brăteşti, a village in Răbăgani Commune, Bihor County
 Brăteşti, a village in Căpreni Commune, Gorj County
 Brăteşti, a village in Stolniceni-Prăjescu Commune, Iaşi County
 Brăteşti, a village in Șirna Commune, Prahova County
 Brăteşti, a village in Poeni, Teleorman
 Brăteşti, the former name of Ion Creangă Commune, Neamţ County
 Brăteștii de Jos, a village in Văcărești Commune, Dâmbovița County

See also 
 Bratu (surname)
 Bratia (disambiguation)
 Brăteni (disambiguation)